Indosasa is a genus of East Asian bamboo in the grass family. The species are native to China and Indochina (Laos and Vietnam).

Species

References

Bambusoideae
Bambusoideae genera
Grasses of Asia
Flora of Laos
Flora of Vietnam
Grasses of China